The Antonov E-153 (Russian: Э-153) was a prototype Soviet experimental fighter designed by Oleg Antonov.

History
The E-153 project represents the first (of two known) attempts by aircraft designer Oleg Antonov to create fighter aircraft. With an initiative proposal to create a fighter, Oleg K. Antonov turned to the USSR Ministry of Aviation Industry at the beginning of 1947, in response, where he received the approval of M.V. Khrunichev.

See also
List of tailless aircraft

References

External links
 
 Проект истребителя "М" ОКБ-153 О.К.Антонова (СССР. 1947-1948 год) - "Оружейная экзотика". (Нереализованные проекты, опытная и малоизвестная серийная военная техника) — LiveJou...
 Экспериментальный истребитель «М» КБ Антонова (Э-153)
 Антонов М / Э-153
 М ("Маша")
 Экспериментальный истребитель М («Маша»).

1940s Soviet fighter aircraft